New Bermuda may refer to:

New Bermuda, Virginia, original  name of Thomas Dale's 1613 colonial settlement north of Jamestown, at the junction of the Appomattox and the James 
New Bermuda, Florida, proposed site in Florida for resettlement of Bermuda settlers, mapped out in 1750s by John William Gerard de Brahm
New Bermuda (album), album by Deafheaven 2015